Dustin Brown may refer to:
Dustin Brown (ice hockey) (born 1984), American ice hockey player
Dustin Brown (tennis) (born 1984), Jamaican-German tennis player
Dusty Brown (born 1982), American baseball player